Newcastle High School is a public school located in Newcastle, Oklahoma. Newcastle is a rapidly growing suburban community.  Through bond issues, Newcastle has constructed a performing arts center, high school basketball arena, and a football stadium. At one point Newcastle High School was known as the Crickets until it was changed to the Racers. Their school colors also included red until it was officially decided that it would be white and blue with black as an unofficial color. The high school enrolls 498 students in grades 9-12. There is a 96% graduation rate and a student teacher ratio of 17.12:1.

Special courses
Newcastle offers over 30 different electives. Students also have the opportunity to take college courses their junior and senior years through Oklahoma City Community College and Redlands Community College. Students also are able to enroll in classes at Mid-America Career and Technology Center their junior and senior years of high school.

Graduating requirements
Ref:
 Requirements reflect 25 Units
 4 years of English
 3 units of math, science, & Social Studies must be taken in grades 9-12
 Students must pass the Algebra I EOI, the English II EOI, and two of the remaining five EOIs.
 NCAA, Oklahoma's Promise, and the College Prep/Work-Ready curriculum have additional eligibility requirements.

Nationally certified teachers
Newcastle High School has three Nationally Board Certified Teachers (NBCT). National Board Certification is awarded to accomplished teachers who have gone above and beyond what is expected. Applicants must submit ten assessments to the board, which are reviewed by trained teachers.

Awards
ACT Oklahoma 2011 College Readiness Award  
 The recognition means each school has shown a significant increase in its ACT composite score over the past five years, while at the same time increasing the number of students taking the ACT assessment. The result is a greater number of Oklahoma students prepared for college.
 Only 5 percent of the high schools in Oklahoma were able to achieve the 2011 College Readiness Award. But, more than 76 percent of Oklahoma students took the ACT in 2011 – an all-time high.

Clubs and organizations
Ref:
 Academic Team
 Band
 Book Club
 Business Professionals of America  (BPA)
 Captain's Council
 Choir
 Creative Writing Club
 Family, Career and Community Leaders of America  (FCCLA)
 FIRST Tech Challenge and FIRST Robotics Competition
 Link Crew
 Math Club
 National FFA Organization  (Future Farmers of America)
 National Honor Society
 Science Club
 Spanish Club
 Student Council
 Students Against Destructive Decisions (SADD)
 Yearbook

Athletics
The Newcastle Racers compete in many sports organized by the Oklahoma Secondary School Activities Association. The Racers won the Class 3A State Football Championship in 1992.

Fall Sports
cheerleading
2013 State Champions,
2015 State Champions,
2012 National Champions,

Football
Cross Country
Fast pitch Softball
2014 OSSAA Class 4A State Champions

Volleyball

Winter Sports

Boys' Basketball
Girls' Basketball
2016 OSSAA Class 4A State Champions

Wrestling

Spring Sports

Slow Pitch Softball
Track
State Champions: Ashley Bryant- Shot Put (2011, 2013) Katie Riojas- 300H (2012)

Boys' Soccer
Girls' Soccer
Baseball
Golf

Bond Issue Information
Ref:

Bond Overview
To date, the bond projects that have been completed include the new wellness center, field house and concession stand/bathrooms, artificial turf football field, technology and transportation upgrades, bleachers in the middle school gym, and a transportation maintenance facility. The 25,000 square foot, 700-seat auditorium, and the 9,500 square foot library on the Newcastle High School campus is set to be complete for the 2012–2013 school year. The auditorium addition also includes a new vocal music classroom, which currently meets in the band room, and a new drama classroom.

Bond Facts
Voters approved the $50.5 million bond in December 2009.
A majority of bond projects have already been completed, leaving only the auditorium, high school classrooms and library addition and Early Childhood Center remaining. 
All are slated to be complete in time for the start of the 2012–2013 school year.
Kahle Wilson of Design Architects Plus has designed all of the bond construction projects for Newcastle Schools.

Notable alumni
Anthony Sykes – Oklahoma State Senator, District 24

References

External links
 Newcastle Public Schools Home Page
 OSSAA: Oklahoma Secondary School Activities Association
 Newcastle, OK Chamber of Commerce
 Oklahoma State Department of Education

Schools in McClain County, Oklahoma
Public high schools in Oklahoma